The women's pentathlon event  at the 1998 European Athletics Indoor Championships was held on 27 February.

Results

References

Combined events at the European Athletics Indoor Championships
Pentathlon
1998 in women's athletics